Gergana 'Gigi' Branzova (Bulgarian: Гергана Брънзова) (born July 25, 1976 in Burgas, Bulgaria) is a former professional basketball player from Bulgaria. She was a member of the Bulgarian National team. She began her career in Nephtohimik, Burgas. Before attending Florida International University in Miami 1994–98, she was voted MVP for the season in 1993-94 while competing for DZU Stara Zagora, Bulgaria under the coaching of Boycho Branzov (her father and a legendary basketball player in Bulgaria). After graduating she was drafted by Detroit Shock WNBA and thus becoming the first Bulgarian player to compete in WNBA. Also played for Reims, France, Asteras Exarhion, Greece, Fenerbahçe İstanbul, Migrosspor, Mersin Metropolitan Municipality B.K., Kosice, Slovakia and Beşiktaş Cola Turka in Turkey where she ended her active career in 2010.

She was married to Turkish basketballer Harun Erdenay in 2003 and divorced in 2014. They have 3 children.

References

1976 births
Living people
Power forwards (basketball)
Bulgarian women's basketball players
Turkish women's basketball players
Bulgarian people of Turkish descent
Detroit Shock players
Fenerbahçe women's basketball players
Beşiktaş women's basketball players
Bulgarian expatriate basketball people in Turkey
Bulgarian expatriate basketball people in the United States
FIU Panthers women's basketball players